The Consulate-General of Mexico in Dallas (Spanish: Consulado-General de México en Dallas) is a diplomatic mission of Mexico in Dallas, Texas, United States.

Alfredo Corchado of The Dallas Morning News said that as of 2009, in terms of activity and size of the area Mexican population, the Dallas consulate is considered to be the third most important Mexican consulate after Los Angeles and Chicago.

The consulate moved from 8855 North Stemmons Freeway to 1210 River Bend Drive in January 2009.

On Wednesday May 6, 2009, lawyers filed a class action lawsuit in the Dallas County District Court; in it four Dallas County residents said that "corruption and greed" were in the consulate. In August 2009 the Mexican government announced that it would remove Enrique Hubbard Urrea, the consul general, from his post due to allegations of corruption. Hubbard was very popular with area immigrants.

See also
 List of diplomatic missions of Mexico

References

External links
 Consulate-General of Mexico in Dallas

Dallas
Mexico
Mexico–United States relations